Double Exposure is a 1982 American horror film written and directed by William Byron Hillman, co-produced by Michael Callan, and starring Callan, Joanna Pettet, James Stacy, and Seymour Cassel. It is a loose remake of the 1974 film The Photographer, which was also written and directed by Hillman, produced by Deming, and starring Callan. The film follows a photographer who starts to experience dreams in which he murders the models he photographs.

Cast

Production
The film was shot in early 1981. According to Cleavon Little, "all the actors got points in the project instead of real big salaries."

Release
Double Exposure was given a regional limited release, opening in Indiana on September 3, 1982.

Critical response
Lee Pfeiffer of Cinema Retro called the film "generally engrossing and well-made", though he wrote that the film's "ending veers into cliched 'woman in jeopardy' territory and the final few frames of the movie, in which the killer is unveiled, boasts some fine acting but disintegrates into a confusing and frustrating scenario in the last hectic seconds."

Home media
In April 2017, Double Exposure was restored in 2K and released on DVD and Blu-ray by Vinegar Syndrome, both as a standard edition release and as a limited edition release with a slipcover.

References

Sources

External links
 
 

1982 films
1980s English-language films
1980s mystery thriller films
1980s psychological horror films
1980s psychological thriller films
American mystery thriller films
American psychological horror films
American psychological thriller films
Crown International Pictures films
Films about photographers
Films about dreams
1980s American films